Inspector B was an American Thoroughbred racehorse best known for winning the 1886 Belmont Stakes.

Background

Inspector B was bred at Belle Meade Stud in Tennessee by William Giles Harding. His sire was Enquirer, and his dam was Colossa. He was previously registered as Envoleur, but his name was later changed to Inspector B. He was named after the head of the New York City Police Department detective department, Thomas F. Byrnes. He was later sold to the Dwyer Brothers, Philip J. Dwyer and Michael F. Dwyer.

Racing career

As a two-year-old, Inspector B came second in the August Stakes, the Champagne Stakes, and the Great Eastern Handicap.

At age three, Inspector B ran in the Belmont alongside another horse owned by the Dwyer Brothers, Buffalo. Buffalo's purpose was to act as a rabbit, setting the pace early in hopes of tiring out other horses and allowing Inspector B to win. The horse to beat was The Bard, who'd won that year's Preakness Stakes. Inspector B was sent off as the favorite, with The Bard as a second choice. During the race, Buffalo set a quick pace, which The Bard matched at first, taking the lead. Towards the end of the race, Buffalo started to tire, and Inspector B took the lead. The Bard almost caught up with him with a furlong to go, but ultimately lost. Inspector B won the race by a length, beating four other horses.

11 days after his victory in the Belmont, Inspector B won the Tidal Stakes. During the rest of the season, he won the Harvest Handicap, the Lorillard Stakes, the United States Hotel Stakes, and the Travers Stakes. He came second in the Green Grass Stakes and the Coney Island Derby, and came third in the Sequel Stakes.

Inspector B continued racing for several more years. At age six, he won the Bay Ridge Handicap, the Brookdale Handicap, and the Lawnview Handicap. He also came second in the Green Grass Stakes.

Later life

Following the 1889 season,  Inspector B was retired to stud, where he had a respectable career. In 1907, he was sold to a farmer for $15 after his owner deemed him no longer useful. The farmer stated he intended to geld Inspector B and use him to plow his crops.

Pedigree

References

1883 racehorse births
Racehorses bred in Tennessee
Racehorses trained in the United States
Belmont Stakes winners